"America" is a science fiction short story by American writer Orson Scott Card,  originally published in the January 1987 issue of Asimov's Science Fiction magazine. It was reprinted  in Card's short story collection The Folk of the Fringe.

Plot summary
This story begins before the war that destroys America. In it, a teenage boy named Sam Monson travels to Brazil with his father. While there, he begins dreaming about a woman who lives in a nearby Indian village named Anamari.  When he goes to the village, he finds the woman and begins helping her take care of the villagers.  While there, he learns that she also has dreams that come true and that she is dreaming about giving birth to a boy who will become the future leader of an America that is controlled by American Indians. On his last night in Brazil, Sam sleeps with Anamari and she gets pregnant with that boy. Years after the war when Sam is the governor of the state of Deseret, Amamari comes to meet with him to negotiate a peace treaty on behalf of their son, Quetzalcoatl (named after Quetzalcoatl, a Mesoamerican deity). Sam goes, and takes with him a man named Carpenter, to whom he later tells his story.

Connection to the other stories
At the end of the story "West" by Orson Scott Card, Deaver Teague and the group he is traveling with meet with Sam Monson, the governor of Deseret. In the short story "The Fringe" the main character is a teacher named Mr. Carpenter who discovers that some of the men in town are stealing from the rest of the people and reports it to the authorities.

Influences
As with much of Card's other literature, a Christian/Mormon influence is present in this story.

Characters
Mr. Carpenter - narrator
Sam Monson - becomes governor of Deseret
Anamari Boagente - Indian from Brazil
Baniwa villagers - unnamed
little girl with palsy - unnamed
Sam’s father - unnamed
Sam’s mother - unnamed
Baniwa hunter - unnamed
oil company employees - unnamed
chopper pilot - unnamed
two American Indian men - unnamed
Quetzalcoatl - Sam and Anamari's son

References
"America" by Orson Scott Card
"West" by Orson Scott Card
"The Fringe" by Orson Scott Card

External links 
 
 The official Orson Scott Card website

1987 short stories
Short stories by Orson Scott Card
Post-apocalyptic short stories
Mormonism in fiction
Works originally published in Asimov's Science Fiction